Cananga (ultimately from Proto-Malayo-Polynesian *kanaŋa) is a small genus of trees in the family Annonaceae, native to Indo-China and Malesia, but introduced elsewhere. One of its species, Cananga odorata, is important as the source of the perfume ylang-ylang.

Species
Two species are recognized:

 Cananga brandisiana (Pierre) Saff., syn. Cananga latifolia (Hook.f. & Thomson) Finet & Gagnep.
 Cananga odorata (Lam.) Hook.f. & Thomson

Cananga latifolia is listed as a separate species in some sources, but the basionym, Unona latifolia
Hook.f. & Thomson, is a later homonym of Unona latifolia Dunal and so is not an acceptable name. Unona brandisiana was explicitly proposed as a replacement name.

References

Annonaceae
Annonaceae genera